Charles-Noël Barbès (December 25, 1914 – June 8, 2008) was a Canadian politician and lawyer. He was elected to the House of Commons of Canada as a Member of the Liberal Party in 1957 for the riding of Chapleau. He lost in the election of 1958. He was born in Hull, Quebec, Canada.

References
Charles-Noël Barbès' obituary

External links
 

1914 births
2008 deaths
Liberal Party of Canada MPs
Members of the House of Commons of Canada from Quebec
Politicians from Gatineau